NGC 1978 (also known as ESO 85-SC90) is an elliptical shaped globular cluster or open cluster in the constellation Dorado. It is located within the Large Magellanic Cloud. It was discovered by James Dunlop on November 6, 1826. At an aperture of 50 arcseconds, its apparent V-band magnitude is 10.20, but at this wavelength, it has 0.16 magnitudes of interstellar extinction. It appears 3.9 arcminutes wide. NGC 1978 has a radial velocity of 293.1 ± 0.9 km/s.

The northwest half of NGC 1978 is iron-rich and younger whereas the southeast part of the cluster has very little iron. NGC 1978 is also highly elliptical (ε ∼ 0.30 ± 0.02), suggesting tidal action between it and the Large Magellanic Cloud. It is rich in pulsating asymptotic giant branch stars, often oxygen-rich or carbon-rich. NGC 1978 is about 2 billion years old. All else equal, older star clusters have higher mass-to-luminosity ratios; that is, they have lower luminosities for the same mass.

References

External links
 

Globular clusters
ESO objects
1978
Dorado (constellation)
Large Magellanic Cloud
18260906